The 156th Massachusetts General Court, consisting of the Massachusetts Senate and the Massachusetts House of Representatives, met in 1949 and 1950 during the governorship of Paul A. Dever. Chester A. Dolan Jr. and Harris S. Richardson served as presidents of the Senate. Thomas P. O'Neill served as speaker of the House.

In 1949, after 90 years of Republican control of the House, Democrats gained a majority. In 1950, the General Court passed a bill prohibiting racial discrimination or segregation in housing.

Senators

Representatives

See also
 81st United States Congress
 List of Massachusetts General Courts

References

Further reading

External links
 
 
 
 

Political history of Massachusetts
Massachusetts legislative sessions
massachusetts
1949 in Massachusetts
massachusetts
1950 in Massachusetts